The Irish Baseball League (IBL) is the men's league in Ireland. It started play in 1997. The season runs from March to October  and are played on the weekends.

Club sides and fields
The O'Malley Fields at Corkagh Park in Clondalkin, West Dublin are the main home of Irish Baseball and current home field for the Dublin City Hurricanes and the Dublin Spartans. The Greystones Mariners play at Shanganagh Park in Shankill, County Dublin. The Ashbourne Baseball Club plays at the International Baseball Centre in Ashbourne, County Meath.  The Belfast Northstars and the Ulster Buccaneers currently play at Hydebank. Comets play at the Peace Link in Clones, County Monaghan.  The Cork City Cosmos play at the Cork Showgrounds.

As of the 2020 season, the following teams were participating at the associated venues:

Irish A League history
 Irish League Champions (1997–present)

 2022 – Ashbourne Giants
 2021 –  Mariners Baseball
 2020 – Mariners Baseball
 2019 – Dublin City Hurricanes
 2018 – Dublin City Hurricanes
 2017 – Dublin City Hurricanes
 2016 – Dublin City Hurricanes 
 2015 – Dublin City Hurricanes
 2014 – Mariners Baseball
 2013 – Spartans
 2012 – Spartans
 2011 – Spartans
 2010 – Spartans 
 2009 – Spartans
 2008 – Spartans
 2007 – Spartans
 2006 – Spartans
 2005 – Dublin City Hurricanes 
 2004 – Spartans
 2003 – Dublin City Hurricanes
 2002 – Spartans
 2001 – Panthers
 2000 – Spartans
 1999 – Spartans
 1998 – Panthers
 1997 – Panthers

See also
Baseball in Ireland

References

External links
Baseball Ireland Official website
Belfast Baseball Association
The Emerald Diamond
Irish National Team pitcher Cormac Eklof's blog
Register of Irish-born Major League Baseball players
Official website of the Ashbourne Baseball Club

 
Ireland
Baseball
Baseball in Ireland
Sports leagues established in 1997
1997 establishments in Ireland
Professional sports leagues in Ireland